Word games (also called word game puzzles or word search games) are spoken, board, or video games often designed to test ability with language or to explore its properties.

Word games are generally used as a source of entertainment, but can additionally serve an educational purpose. Young children can enjoy playing games such as Hangman, while naturally developing important language skills like spelling. Researchers have found that adults who regularly solved crossword puzzles, which require familiarity with a larger vocabulary, had better brain function later in life.

Popular word-based game shows have been a part of television and radio throughout broadcast history, including Spelling Bee, the first televised game show, and Wheel of Fortune, the longest-running syndicated game show in the United States.

Categories of word game

Letter arrangement games 

In a letter arrangement game, the goal is to form words out of given letters. These games generally test vocabulary skills as well as lateral thinking skills. Some examples of letter arrangement games include Scrabble, Upwords, Bananagrams, Countdown and Paperback.

Paper and pencil games 

In a paper and pencil game, players write their own words, often under specific constraints. For example, a crossword requires players to use clues to fill out a grid, with words intersecting at specific letters. Other examples of paper and pencil games include hangman, categories, Boggle, and word searches.

Semantic games 
Semantic games focus on the semantics of words, utilising their meanings and the shared knowledge of players as a mechanic. Mad Libs, Blankety Blank, and Codenames are all semantic games.

Modern word games 
As part of the modern "Golden Age" of board games, designers have created a variety of newer, non-traditional word games, often with more complex rules. Games like Codenames, Decrypto, and Anomia were all designed after 2010, and have earned widespread acclaim. Mobile games like Words with Friends and Word Connect have also brought word games to modern audiences.

In media 
Many popular word games have been adapted to television and radio game shows. As well as the examples given above, shows like Lingo, Says You!, Catchphrase, and Only Connect either revolve around or include elements of word games. Word games have also been launched on the Internet and featured in major publications, such as The New York Times Spelling Bee.

See also 
 Anagram dictionary
 Double entendre
 Fortunately, Unfortunately
 Language game
 List of puzzle video games
 Phono-semantic matching
 Puns
 Puzzles
 Rebusespicture puzzles representing a word
 Verbal arithmetic
 Word play
 Word Ways: The Journal of Recreational Linguistics

References